El Caso. Crónica de sucesos is a Spanish procedural television series, starring Verónica Sánchez and Fernando Guillén Cuervo. The plot follows two investigative journalists working for a sensationalist newspaper in Francoist Spain. Produced by RTVE in collaboration with Plano a Plano, it aired in 2016 on La 1.

Premise 
The fiction is set in Madrid in 1966. The plot tells the story of a newspaper's newsroom specialised in reporting lurid crimes happening in Francoist Spain, focusing on the reports of two investigative journalists working for the newspaper El Caso, Clara López (Verónica Sánchez) and Jesús Expósito (Fernando Guillén Cuervo), often running parallel to the police investigations.

Cast 
 Verónica Sánchez as Clara López-Doriga, new journalist of El Caso, upper-middle class woman educated abroad.
 Fernando Guillén Cuervo as Jesús Expósito, investigative journalist of El Caso, former policeman.
 Antonio Garrido as Antonio Camacho, chief police officer, antagonistic towards Jesús.
  as Miguel Montenegro, young police officer.
 Natalia Verbeke as Rebeca Martín, forensic doctor, friend of Jesús.
 Fernando Cayo as Rodrigo Sánchez, editor of El Caso.
  as Germán Castro, journalist and boxer.
  as Margarita Moyano, experienced journalist.
  as Aníbal de Vicente, a writer of El Caso.
 Teresa Hurtado de Ory as Paloma García, secretary of El Caso.
 Marc Clotet as Gerardo de Zabaleta, Clara's husband, a diplomat.
 María Casal as Laura, Clara's aunt, an actress.
 Carlos Manuel Díaz as Fernando López-Dóriga, Clara's father, a senior civil servant at the Ministry of Information and Tourism.
 Ignacio Mateos as Aparicio Huesca, designer and illustrator of El Caso.
  as Manuel Cabrera, a civil servant working at the Ministry of Information and Tourism.

Production and release 
El Caso.

Iñaki Mercero, Javier Quintas and José Ramos Paíno directed the episodes, whereas Olga Salvador, Mauricio Romero, Joan Barbero, Juan Moya and Guadalupe Rilova authored the screenplay. The series began shooting on 21 October 2015. A 1,500 square metre set in San Sebastián de los Reyes was used for much of the indoor filming, including the editorial office of the newspaper and the police premises.

The series consisted of 13 episodes with an approximate running time of 70 minutes. The series premiered on 15 March 2016. The marketing of the series employed an early example of transmedia storytelling in Spanish TV, by means of the release of a 10-min shortfilm on 12 April 2016 in order to engage the public. The broadcasting run ended on 7 June 2016. While the series received critical acclaim, the viewership figures were not considered good enough by RTVE to renew the series for a second season. The series sparked a spin-off web series, Abducidos, focused on two characters from the original series (Aníbal and Aparicio) now working for the Spanish public television broadcaster.

Awards and nominations 

|-
| align = "center" rowspan = "2" | 2016 || 8th FesTVal Vitoria-Gasteiz || colspan = "2" | Best Fiction ||  ||
|-
| 4th 
| Best Drama Actress
| Verónica Sánchez
| 
| align = "center" | 
|-
| align = "center" rowspan = "3" | 2017 || rowspan = "3" | 4th Feroz Awards || colspan = "2" | Best Drama Series ||  || rowspan = "3" | 
|-
| Best Actress in a TV Series || Verónica Sánchez || 
|-
| Best Actor in a TV Series || Fernando Guillén Cuervo || 
|-
|}

References 

La 1 (Spanish TV channel) network series
Television series about journalism
Spanish crime television series
2010s Spanish drama television series
2016 Spanish television series debuts
2016 Spanish television series endings
Television shows set in Madrid
Television series set in 1966
Television shows filmed in Spain
2010s crime drama television series
Television series by Plano a Plano